Convoy Battles of World War II occurred when convoys of cargo ships assembled for mutual defense, and were attacked by enemy submarines, surface ships, and/or aircraft. Most were in the North Atlantic from 1939 to 1943, and involved attacks by U-boat wolfpacks. Convoy battles also occurred in the Arctic Ocean, Mediterranean Sea and western Pacific Ocean.

Battles

Notes

References

 
 
 
 
 
 
 
 
 
 
 

Battle of the Atlantic
Naval warfare tactics
Wolfpacks of World War II
World War II naval-related lists